The 1886 Rhode Island gubernatorial election was held on April 7, 1886. Incumbent Republican George P. Wetmore defeated Democratic nominee Amasa Sprague with 53.36% of the vote.

General election

Candidates
Major party candidates
George P. Wetmore, Republican
Amasa Sprague, Democratic

Other candidates
George H. Slade, Prohibition

Results

Notes

References

1886
Rhode Island
Gubernatorial